Prostanthera incana, commonly known as velvet mint-bush, is a species of flowering plant in the family Lamiaceae and is endemic to south-eastern continental Australia. It is an erect, moderately dense shrub with egg-shaped leaves, and lilac-coloured flowers, found mostly in near-coastal southern New South Wales.

Description
Flowering occurs from August to December.

Taxonomy
Prostanthera incana was first formally described in 1834 by George Bentham from an unpublished description by Alan Cunningham, based on specimens collected by Charles Fraser in the Blue Mountains and by Cunningham near the junction of the Nepean and Warragamba Rivers. The description was published in Bentham's book, Labiatarum Genera et Species.

Distribution and habitat
Velvet mint-bush grows in forest and woodland in shallow sandy soil in near-coastal New South Wales, south from Craven in the Hunter Valley. There is also a small population near Dargo in Victoria.

References

incana
Flora of New South Wales
Flora of Victoria (Australia)
Lamiales of Australia
Plants described in 1834
Taxa named by Allan Cunningham (botanist)